Talfryn Evans (10 June 1914 – 31 March 1944) was a Welsh cricketer. He was a left-handed batsman and left-arm slow bowler who played for Glamorgan. He was born and died at Llanelli, Carmarthenshire.

Evans, a left-arm spin bowler who, due to a bout of rheumatic fever he suffered as a child, was unable to fully use his right arm, and thus worked on left-arm spin bowling. Having played club cricket for Llanelli, he made just a single first-class appearance, during the 1934 season, against Kent, though he appeared regularly for the Second XI.

Evans died at the age of just 29 years old.

External links
Talfryn Evans at Cricket Archive

1914 births
1944 deaths
Cricketers from Llanelli
Welsh cricketers
Glamorgan cricketers